Jamal Rashid Abdulrahman Yusuf (born 7 November 1988), commonly known as Jamal Rashid, is a Bahraini footballer who plays for Al-Muharraq SC in the Bahraini Premier League.

Club career
Jamal began his professional career in 2005 with Al-Ahli (Manama). He scored six goals in his four-seasons spell at the club. He helped his team to reach the finals of the 2005 Bahraini Crown Prince Cup and 2006 Bahraini King's Cup, finish at the second position in the 2005–06 Bahraini Premier League, reach the finals of the 2007 Bahraini FA Cup and 2008 Bahraini Crown Prince Cup. Then in 2009, he moved to Riffa S.C. where he helped his team to reach the finals of the 2009 Bahraini Crown Prince Cup and 2009 Bahraini King's Cup, win the 2010 Bahraini King's Cup and finish at the second position in the 2010–11 Bahrain First Division League.

After spending a long four-seasons spell in Bahrain with Al-Ahli and Riffa S.C., he moved to Oman in 2011 and signed a one-year contract with Omani giants Dhofar S.C.S.C. He helped his team to win the 2012 Omani Federation Cup and finish as the runner-up of the 2012 Omani Super Cup.

He came back to Bahrain in 2012 and signed a one-year contract with one of his former clubs, Al-Ahli.

On 13 July 2013, he came back to Oman and signed a one-year contract with Al-Nahda Club. He helped his team to reach the finals of the 2012 Sultan Qaboos Cup.

On 1 June 2014, he came back to Bahrain and signed a four-seasons contract with Al-Muharraq SC.

Club career statistics

Honours

Club
With Al-Ahli
Bahraini Premier League (0): Runner-up 2005–06
Bahraini Crown Prince Cup (0): Runner-up 2005, 2008 Bahraini Crown Prince Cup
Bahraini King's Cup (0): Runner-up 2006
Bahraini FA Cup (1): 2007
With Dhofar
Omani Federation Cup (1): 2012
Omani Super Cup (0): Runner-up 2012
With Al-Nahda
Oman Professional League (1): 2013-14
Sultan Qaboos Cup (0): Runner-up 2012, 2013

National team career statistics

Goals for Senior National Team
Scores and results list Bahrain's goal tally first.

References

External links

Jamal Rashed Abdulrahman Yusuf at Goal.com

1988 births
Living people
People from Muharraq
Bahraini footballers
Bahrain international footballers
Bahraini expatriate footballers
Association football defenders
Al-Muharraq SC players
Bahraini Premier League players
Dhofar Club players
Al-Nahda Club (Oman) players
Oman Professional League players
2019 AFC Asian Cup players
Expatriate footballers in Oman
Bahraini expatriate sportspeople in Oman